Chengdu North railway station is a classification yard in Xindu District, Chengdu, Sichuan, China. It covers an area of 287,000 square meters. It is the largest classification yard in the Southwest China.

History
It opened on April 18, 2007.

See also
It should not be confused with North railway station on the Chengdu Metro situated underneath Chengdu railway station, which is also commonly called "North railway station" by locals.

See also
Chengdu railway station

References

Railway stations in Sichuan
Railway stations in China opened in 2007
Buildings and structures in Chengdu
Transport in Chengdu